is a Japanese romantic comedy light novel series written by Kyōsuke Kamishiro and illustrated by Takayaki. The series began serialization on the online novel website Kakuyomu in August 2017, with a print version beginning publication under Kadokawa Shoten's Kadokawa Sneaker Bunko imprint in December 2018. The light novel is licensed digitally in North America by J-Novel Club. A manga adaptation by Rei Kusakabe began serialization online by Fujimi Shobo via Niconico Seiga website as part of the Dra Dra Sharp and Dra Dra Flat brands in April 2019. An anime television series adaptation produced by Project No.9 aired from July to September 2022.

Synopsis
When they were middle schoolers, Mizuto and Yume were a completely normal couple. Between flirtations and shouting matches for minor reasons, the two students stayed together until they entered high school, where they finally decided to break up. What they do not know is that fate sometimes has many surprises in store, and that they will be reunited again as stepbrother and sister only after two weeks.
 
Indeed, their respective parents are about to remarry and the former couple will have to live under the same roof on a daily basis. In order not to hinder their parents' happiness, they accept the situation and decide to put in place the rule of brothers and sisters, according to which the first who feels attraction towards the other loses.

Characters

Mizuto is Yume's ex-boyfriend who became her stepbrother when his father, Mineaki, remarried her mother, Yuni. He shares a fondness for reading with Yume and has high grades, leading to a competitive relationship with her. He and Yume were born on the same day. His mother died when he was young.

Her name was  before her mother, Yuni, married Mizuto's father, Mineaki Irido, two weeks after she and Mizuto broke up. She and Mizuto were born on the same day. She is an excellent student and is fond of reading novels. She wore glasses when she was in middle school and dating Mizuto.

Kogure's childhood friend. She and Kogure previously dated.

Akatsuki's childhood friend. He and Akatsuki previously dated.

Mizuto and Yume's classmate. She is fond of reading books such as light novels. She frequents the library, where she meets up with Mizuto.

Mizuto's father who married Yume's mother after his first wife died.

Yume's mother who married Mizuto's father after divorcing her first husband.

Production
The first names of Yume and Mizuto come from "oil" (the pronunciation of oil (油) is yu in Japanese) and "water" (mizu means water (水) in Japanese), respectively. The surnames of Irido, Ayai, Higashira (lit. "east head") and Tanesato come from Conan Doyle ("Irido" is almost an anagram of "Doiru", which is the Japanese pronunciation of Doyle), Yukito Ayatsuji (only the word Aya (綾) is taken), Nisio Isin (while Nisio is the surname, it literally means "west tail", the opposite of "east head") and Ellery Queen (while Queen is a duo whose surnames are Dannay and Lee, "Danna-" is pronounced like tane and "Lee" is pronounced like ri ("里" can be pronounced as sato and ri in Japanese)), respectively.

The author Kyōsuke Kamishiro set Yume and Mizuto's birthday as November 3 because both 11 and 3 are prime numbers, which cannot be "separated" (in Japanese, "割る" means "to divide" and "to separate").

The location setting of the story had been kept ambiguous since its web serialization. However, after several years, Kamishiro decided to set it in an actual location, Kyoto, since the story in Volume 8 takes place in Kobe.

Media

Light novels
The series began serialization on the online novel website Kakuyomu on August 7, 2017, with a print version beginning publication under Kadokawa Shoten's Kadokawa Sneaker Bunko imprint on December 1, 2018; the series has nine volumes as of July 1, 2022. The light novel is licensed digitally in North America by J-Novel Club.

In the Blu-ray set of the anime series, an original what-if story titled  written by Kyōsuke Kamishiro is included. The story is about what if Yume and Mizuto did not break up before they became stepsiblings.

Manga
A manga adaptation by Rei Kusakabe began serialization online via Niconico Seiga website as part of the Dra Dra Sharp and Dra Dra Flat brands on April 26, 2019, and has been compiled into five volumes by Fujimi Shobo as of December 9, 2022.

Anime
An anime adaptation was announced on July 21, 2021. It was later revealed to be a television series produced by Project No.9. The series was directed by Shinsuke Yanagi, with Deko Akao handling the scripts, Katsuyuki Sato designing the characters, and Hiromi Mizutani composing the music. It aired from July 6 to September 21, 2022, on AT-X, Tokyo MX, BS NTV, MBS, and BS Fuji. Crunchyroll has licensed the series.

Episode list

See also
Arifureta: From Commonplace to World's Strongest, another light novel series illustrated by the same illustrator

Notes

References

External links
  at Kakuyomu 
  
  
  
 

2018 Japanese novels
Anime and manga based on light novels
AT-X (TV network) original programming
Crunchyroll anime
Fujimi Shobo manga
J-Novel Club books
Japanese webcomics
Kadokawa Sneaker Bunko
Light novels
Light novels first published online
Project No.9
Romantic comedy anime and manga
School life in anime and manga
Shōnen manga
Television shows set in Kyoto
Webcomics in print